Dell is an English unisex given name, nickname, and surname. It means "small valley or glen" and comes from the Old English word del.

Its feminine form, popular in the early 20th C., is Della.

Notable people and fictional characters with the name include:

Given name or nickname

People
 Dell Alston (born 1952), American baseball player
 Dell Curry (born 1964), American former National Basketball Association player
 Dell L. Dailey (born 1949), American retired lieutenant general and government official
 Dell Darling (1861–1904), American baseball player
 Dell Demps (born 1970), American basketball player and executive
 Dell Henderson (1877–1956), Canadian actor, director and writer
 Dell Hymes (1927–2009), American ethnographer, sociolinguist, anthropologist and folklorist
 Dell Morgan ( 1900–1962), American football player and coach of football, basketball and baseball
 Dell O'Dell (1902–1962), stage name of American magician Odella Newton
 Dell Raybould (born 1933), American politician
 Dell Sanchez, former social worker, educator, and broadcasting executive
 Dell Williams (1922–2015), American feminist and businesswoman

Fictional characters
 Dell Conagher, also known as the Engineer, a playable character in the video game Team Fortress 2
 Dell Parker, in the TV series Private Practice
 Dell Toledo, in American Horror Story: Freak Show

Surname
Alan Dell (1924–1995), British radio broadcaster
Allan Dell (born 1992), South African-born Scottish rugby player
Bernard Dell (born 1949), Australian botanist
Christian Dell (1893–1974), German silversmith and designer
Christopher Dell (born 1956), American diplomat
Christopher Dell (cricketer) (born 1960), Australian former cricketer
Claudia Dell (1910–1977), American showgirl and actress
Dick Dell (born 1947), American tennis player
Donald Dell (born 1938), American tennis player
Dorothy Dell (1915–1934), American actress
Edmund Dell (1921–1999), British politician
Ethel M. Dell (1881–1939), British romance novelist
Floyd Dell (1887–1969), American newspaper and magazine editor, literary critic, novelist, playwright and poet
Gabriel Dell (1919–1988), American actor, one of the Dead End Kids
Gaye Dell (born 1948), Australian hurdler and children's author
Glen Dell (1962–2013), South African commercial airline trainer and aerobatics pilot
Jimmy Dell (1924–2008), British test pilot
John Henry Dell (1830–1888), English landscape artist and illustrator
Michael Dell (born 1965), American businessman, founder and CEO of Dell, Inc.
Miriam Dell (1924–2022), New Zealand women's advocate
Nathaniel Dell (born 1999), American football player
Peter Dell the Elder (1490–1552), German sculptor
Philip Dell, American politician in Florida from the 1820s to the 1850s and plantation owner
Richard Dell (1920–2002), New Zealand malacologist
Roger L. Dell (1897–1966), American jurist
Salome Dell (born 1983), athlete from Papua New Guinea
Tony Dell (born 1947), Australian cricketer
Wheezer Dell (1886–1966), American Major League Baseball pitcher
William Dell (c. 1607–1669), English clergyman and radical Parliamentarian

See also
 Big Dell, nickname of Wendell Sailor (born 1974), Australian rugby footballer
Del (disambiguation), contains list of people with given name Del
O'Dell, a surname

References

Masculine given names
Lists of people by nickname
English-language unisex given names